Yurd Dasht-e Zalzaleh (also Romanized as Yūrd Dasht-e Zalzaleh) is a village in Qotbabad Rural District, Kordian District, Jahrom County, Fars Province, Iran. At the 2006 census, its population was 31, in 9 families.

References 

Populated places in Jahrom County